Pomoravlje may refer to:

 Morava Valley (Serbian Latin: Pomoravlje), a geographical area in Serbia around the Great Morava  and its tributaries
 Great Morava Valley (Great Pomoravlje), or only Morava Valley (Pomoravlje)
 West Morava Valley (Western Pomoravlje)
 South Morava Valley (Southern Pomoravlje)
 Kosovo Morava Valley (Kosovo Pomoravlje), or Binač Morava Valley (Binač Pomoravlje), a geographical area in Kosovo around the Binač Morava
 Pomoravlje District, a district in Serbia
 Kosovo-Pomoravlje District, a former district in Kosovo, still recognized by Serbia